I Spy or iSpy may refer to:

Game
I spy, a guessing game
Industrial Spy: Operation Espionage, also known as I Spy, a squad-based tactical strategy game

Books

I-Spy (Michelin), a  series of spotter's guides for children
I Spy (Scholastic), a 1990s series of picture books by Jean Marzollo and Walter Wick

Film and television
I Spy (2002 film), a film starring Eddie Murphy and Owen Wilson
 I Spy, an episode from the BBC children’s show Balamory
I Spy (1934 film), a British film
I Spy (1955 TV series), a TV series starring Raymond Massey
I Spy (1965 TV series), an American television series starring Robert Culp and Bill Cosby
I Spy (2002 TV series), an HBO Family series based on the picture books
"iSpy" (Modern Family), the 14th episode of the fifth season of U.S. television series Modern Family

Music
I Spy (band), a Canadian band
"I Spy" (Erica Baxter song), a 2006 song from Through My Eyes
"iSpy" (Kyle song), a 2016 song by Kyle featuring Lil Yachty

See also
 Eye Spy (disambiguation)